Ching Lai Court is a Home Ownership Scheme court in Lai Chi Kok, Kowloon, Hong Kong, located at the junction of Ching Cheung Road and Kwai Chung Road near Princess Margaret Hospital. Although it is situated at the south of Kwai Chung, it administratively belongs to Sham Shui Po District. It has totally seven blocks and a shopping centre built in 1981.

Houses

References

Lai Chi Kok
Home Ownership Scheme
Buildings and structures completed in 1981
1981 establishments in Hong Kong